James Nicholas Kehoe (July 15, 1862 in Maysville, Kentucky – June 16, 1945 in Cincinnati, Ohio) was a U.S. Representative from Kentucky.

Kehoe was born in Maysville, Kentucky and attended public and private schools. He engaged in the printing business until 1884, and studied law in Louisville, Kentucky before being admitted to the bar on November 1, 1888, and engaged in practice in Maysville. He served as precinct, county, and district chairman of the Democratic executive committee, and the city attorney of Maysville. He also served as master in chancery of the Mason County Circuit Court.

Kehoe was elected as a Democrat to the Fifty-seventh and Fifty-eighth Congresses (March 4, 1901 – March 3, 1905). He was an unsuccessful candidate for reelection in 1904 to the Fifty-ninth Congress. He then served as a delegate to the Democratic National Convention in 1912, and as vice president of the Ohio Valley Improvement Association and of the Burley Tobacco Growers' Cooperation Association. He also engaged in banking and served as president of the Kentucky Bankers' Association.

Kehoe died in Cincinnati, Ohio, June 16, 1945 and was interred in Maysville Cemetery, Maysville, Kentucky.

References

James Nicholas Kehoe at The Political Graveyard

1862 births
1945 deaths
People from Maysville, Kentucky
Kentucky state court judges
Democratic Party members of the United States House of Representatives from Kentucky